Wolf Point is the location at the confluence of the North, South and Main Branches of the Chicago River in the present day Near North Side, Loop, and Near West Side community areas of Chicago. This fork in the river is historically important in the development of early Chicago. The name is said to possibly derive from a Native American Chief whose name translated to wolf, but alternate theories exist.

Historically, the west bank of the river at the fork was called "Wolf Point," but in the 1820s and 1830s it came to denote the entire area and the settlement that grew up around the river-fork. Wolf Point is now often used more specifically to refer to a plot of land on the north side of the fork in the Near North Side community area owned by the Kennedy family as part of the larger Merchandise Mart Center complex. Today the north bank at the fork, is the location of a high-rise and a construction site, the west bank includes condominium high rises, commercial skyscrapers, and railroad tracks, while the south bank includes part of the Chicago Riverwalk and serves as the transition point of Wacker Drive from an east–west street to a north–south street.

Background

The origin of the name, Wolf Point, is unknown. In her 1856 memoir Wau-Bun, Juliette Kinzie states that 'the place was then called Wolf Point, from its having been the residence of an Indian named "Moa-way," or "the Wolf."' Other alternate explanations are that it was so-named after the landlord of what would later be called the Wolf Point Tavern killed a ferocious wolf and hung a painted sign of a wolf outside his tavern to commemorate the event, or that it was named by a soldier at Fort Dearborn because it was a place where wolves would gather at night. Originally the term Wolf Point referred to the west bank of the Chicago River at the fork junction of its branches, but it gradually came to refer to the whole region around the forks and in modern usage is often more specifically used to mean the plot of land on the north side of the forks. The confluence of the three branches of the river near Wolf Point provided inspiration for Chicago's Municipal Device, a Y-shaped, city identification symbol that can be seen on many buildings in Chicago, and on city owned vehicles.

Early settlement

The first non-indigenous settler at Wolf Point may have been a trader named Guarie. Writing in 1880 Gurdon Hubbard, who first arrived in Chicago on October 1, 1818, stated that he had been told of Guarie by Antoine De Champs and Antoine Beson, who had been traversing the Chicago Portage annually since about 1778. Hubbard wrote that De Champs had shown him evidence of a trading house and the remains of a cornfield supposed to have belonged to Guarie. The cornfield was located on the west bank of the North Branch of the Chicago River, a short distance from the forks at what is now Fulton Street; early settlers named the North Branch of the Chicago River the Guarie River, or Gary's River.

James Kinzie, the son of early settler John Kinzie, built a tavern on the west bank of the river at Wolf Point in 1828. By 1829 this tavern was operated for Kinzie by Archibald Caldwell who was granted a liquor license on December 8 of that year. Caldwell left Chicago early in 1830 and Elijah Wentworth became the landlord of the tavern. He was in turn succeeded by Charles Taylor (1831–1833) and William Walters (1833–1836). The tavern became known as the 'Wolf Point Tavern' or 'Wolf Tavern' and a painted sign of a wolf was hung outside the tavern by approximately 1833.

In about 1829, Samuel Miller and his brother John opened a store on the north bank of the river at the forks. In 1830, they enlarged their store and began to operate it as a tavern in competition with the Wolf Point Tavern. On June 2, 1829 Samuel Miller and Archibald Clybourn had been authorized to operate the first ferry across the Chicago River. Clybourn was the ferry man, crossing the North Branch of the river between Miller's tavern and the Wolf Point Tavern. In 1831 John Miller built a log house near his brother's tavern that he used as a tannery; Chicago's first recorded factory. Samuel Miller sold the tavern and moved away following the death of his wife in 1832.

Mark Beaubien opened the Eagle Exchange Tavern in a log cabin on the south bank in 1829. In 1831 Beaubien added a frame addition and opened the Sauganash Hotel, Chicago's first hotel. Immediately adjacent to the hotel's public bar was Chicago's first drug store. Beaubien left the Sauganash Hotel in 1834, but the hotel continued in operation until it was destroyed by a fire in 1851. In 1837, the hotel hosted the first Chicago theatre company in a converted dining room.  The site of the Sauganash Hotel was redeveloped as the Wigwam in 1860; the site today is at 191 North Wacker and is designated as a Chicago Landmark.

James Kinzie built the Green Tree Tavern at the northeastern corner of Canal and Lake Streets in 1833. The tavern went through a succession of owners and name changes before being moved in 1880 to 33, 35, and 37 Milwaukee Avenue. In 1902 plans were made to preserve the building and move it to Garfield Park, however the hotel collapsed before work could start on this project.

Rev. Jesse Walker started the first church on June 14, 1831, with ten members in a log cabin. In 1838, the congregation floated their log cabin across the Chicago River and rolled it on logs to the corner of Washington and Clark Streets, where it is now the First United Methodist Church Chicago Temple.

Archibald Clybourn's ferry across the North Branch of the river was replaced by a bridge in the winter of 1831 and 1832, and a bridge across the South Branch of the river located between Lake and Randolph Streets was added in the winter of 1832 and 1833.

Development

When the Illinois and Michigan Canal opened in 1848, the landmass at Wolf Point was decreased by dredging to accommodate a turning basin for ships. In the autumn of the same year the Galena and Chicago Union Railroad opened Chicago's first railroad depot at Wolf Point, on the southwestern corner of Kinzie and Canal Streets. By 1857 the site of Wolf Point Tavern was being used as a lumber yard; the Fulton Elevator, one of Chicago's earliest grain elevators, was built just to the north of the former tavern in 1852. Several blocks to the west of Wolf Point were destroyed in a large fire on September 15, 1859. The Fulton Elevator survived this, and the Great Chicago Fire of 1871, but was burned down on September 7, 1873. It was rebuilt in the same year, and another grain elevator, the St Paul Elevator, was added immediately to the south of the original in 1879. The Chicago, Milwaukee and St. Paul railway company purchased both elevators in 1889 for $400,000 ($ million today), but demolished them in 1906. Currently, the site is occupied by the Riverbend Condominiums at 333 North Canal Street.

The property on the north bank of the river at Wolf Point was owned by businessman Marshall Field until it was sold to Democratic Party figure and Kennedy family patriarch Joseph P. Kennedy in 1945 or 1946, depending on the source. The area still owned by the Kennedy family is bounded by the Chicago River to the east, west, south and 350 West Mart Center to the north. The Merchandise Mart is located diagonally to the northeast. There have been numerous plans to develop the property dating back to the late 1980s. In 2007, the Kennedys planned to develop the property with three high-rises and skyscrapers to designs by Argentine-American architect César Pelli. In 2012, updated plans were proposed with several target completion dates over the next decade. The property is a coveted real estate location that has had several serious redevelopment plans in the past. In 2014, construction began on the first phase of the planned Wolf Point Towers. A joint venture including the AFL-CIO Building Investment Trust and the Kennedy Family completed the 46-story Wolf Point West tower with union construction labor in 2016. A building permit for construction of Wolf Point East was issued on June 22, 2017 as a 60-story, 698-unit,  building and by June 28, a joint venture of the AFL-CIO Building Investment Trust, the Kennedy Family, and Hines began construction on the $380 million project with a $200 million loan through a lending group that included Bank of America, Citizens Bank, ING Real Estate Finance, and Ullico. Occupancy is expected in 2019.

The south bank is being redeveloped as part of Mayor Rahm Emanuel's plans to extend the Chicago Riverwalk, which is located on the south bank of the Chicago River and will extend from Lake Michigan to the intersection of North Wacker Drive and Lake Street.  Design plans are being finalized as of Spring 2015 with completion targeted by the end of 2016 pending funding.  Currently, the plan will include a three-story retail space, a large park, and an iconic bridge linking Wacker to the Riverwalk path.

See also

 Apparel Center
 Fulton House, Chicago

Notes

Notes

References

Bibliography

External links
construction webcam

History of Chicago